Antemurale Christianitatis (English: Bulwark of Christendom) was a label used for a country defending the frontiers of Christian Europe from the Ottoman Empire.

Albania
In the 15th century Pope Pius II, admiring the Ottoman–Albanian Wars waged mainly by Skanderbeg, defined Albania as Italy's bastion of Christianity. The pope himself declared war on the Ottoman Empire in 1463, but such war was never fought, as the following year he died at Ancona, while still organizing the naval attack on the Ottomans.

Armenia
Armenia, especially the Armenian Kingdom of Cilicia, has been described as the last Christian bulwark in Asia to fall to Muslim rule.

Croatia

Pope Leo X called Croatia the Antemurale Christianitatis in 1519 in a letter to the Croatian ban Petar Berislavić, given that Croatian soldiers made significant contributions in war against the Ottoman Empire. The advancement of the Ottoman Empire in Europe was stopped in 1593 on Croatian soil (Battle of Sisak), which could be in this sense regarded as a historical gate of European civilization. Nevertheless, the Muslim Ottoman Empire occupied part of Croatia from the 15th to the 19th centuries.
However, Pope Leo X wasn't the first that gave Croatia such a title. The nobility of the southern Croatian regions sent a letter to Pope Alexander VI and Roman-German emperor Maximilian I on April 10, 1494 seeking help against the Ottoman attacks. In that letter Croatia was for the first time called bastion and a bulwark of Christianity:
We have been blocking this force (Turks) for almost seventeen years wasting our bodies, lives and all of our goods, and like the bastion and a bulwark of Christianity we daily defend Christian countries, as much as it is humanly possible. That is why we are telling you this: If we get defeated by the Turks, then they might be able to remove Christianity from Croats.
When Turks conquered Constantinople in 1453, Pope Callistus III urged all Christians to the Crusades. Many Croats, led by Saint John of Capistrano, were part of the army that defeated 150,000 Turks at the Siege of Belgrade in 1456. When Belgrade was conquered by the Turks in 1521 many Croatian writers and diplomats pointed out the dramatic situation by stating that Belgrade was the bastion of Christianity, the key to Europe and the fortress of the entire Kingdom of Hungary. In the following year, German Parliament in Nuremberg called Croatia Zwingermaurer (Fortress) and the Austrian Archduke Ferdinand of Habsburg said that "chivalrous Christian nation of Croats is standing as a shield in front of Styria, Carinthia and Carniola, and the whole of Central Europe and Western Christendom." At the session, Prince Bernardin Frankopan asked for help, recalling that "Croatia is a shield and door of Christianity". Fran Krsto Frankopan stated on July 1, 1523 in the memorial to the Pope Adrian VI  that Croatia is a "bulwark or door of Christianity, and especially bordering countries of Carinthia, Carniola, Istria, Friuli, and Italy". Croatian baroque poet Vladislav Mencetić wrote in 1665:

Poland
An early use of the "wall" metaphor to describe Poland occurs in a letter dated 10 March 1241 from Landgrave Henry Raspe to Duke Henry II of Brabant during the first Mongol invasion of Poland, when the invaders were threatening the Holy Roman Empire. Henry wrote, "our nearest wall is alit, and the neighbouring land will be devastated" (paries nobis proximus succenditur, et terra vicina petet vastationi).

For its centuries-long stance against the Muslim advances, the Polish–Lithuanian Commonwealth also gained the name of Antemurale Christianitatis. In 1683 the Battle of Vienna marked a turning point in a 250-year-old struggle between the forces of Christian Europe and the Islamic Ottoman Empire. Wespazjan Kochowski in his Psalmodia polska (The Polish Psalmody, 1695) tells of the special role of Poland in the world (antemurale christianitatis – the bulwark of Christianity) and the superiority of the Polish political system (złota wolność – the golden liberty).

Wallachia and Moldova
Vlad the Impaler defended his country from the Ottoman Empire and Christian diplomats were in awe of his achievements, and moreover grateful that someone was taking the initiative against the invading Muslim army. Pope Pius II himself spoke of Tepes in glowing terms after reading dispatches from his representatives, and sent subsidies from Rome to help his campaign. Te deums rang out in praise of Tepes’s victories, and the inability of Mehmed’s army to cross Wallachia into Central Europe saved a great many cities and countries from being conquered themselves. The Pope awarded him with the titles Athleta Christi and Antemurale Christianitatis. Stephen the Great of Moldova, Vlad's cousin, defeated the Ottomans at the Battle of Vaslui which was the biggest defeat of the Ottoman Empire in the middle ages.

See also 
Holy League (1538)
Holy League (1571)
Holy League (1684)
Holy League (1717)
Christ of Europe
Hundred Years' Croatian–Ottoman War

References

External links
Croatia was already called "Antemurale Christianitatis" (The Frontwall of Christianity) since the battle of Krbava field in 1493 – text by Eva Posch, M.Sc., University of Graz, Austria
Pope Leo X honoured the Croatians with the title "Antemurale Christianitatis" – "The Bulwark of Christianity"
Antemurale Christianitatis – Bulwark of Christianity (video)

History of Catholicism in Europe
Ottoman period in the history of Croatia
Catholicism in the Polish–Lithuanian Commonwealth